Epoch Networks (www.epochnetworks.com) was, at one time, the largest privately held first tier internet service provider ISP founded by Scott Purcell in 1994.  It was the fourth commercial internet backbone in the United States.  Epoch was also one of the first members of the Commercial Internet eXchange—for which, Scott Purcell served as a board member.

An article from ISP Planet states:

"The company got its start in Costa Mesa, California around 1994 when its entire staff consisted of four people with access to a local backbone. By the end of the year, the company was one of the first ISPs connected to the Commercial Internet eXchange, a predecessor of today's Network Access Points."

Internet service providers of the United States